Granjeras was a Chilean reality television and is the third season of The Farm. It was aired from September 26, 2005 to December 22, 2005 by Canal 13 and was produced by Promofilm. It was hosted by Sergio Lagos.

Nominations

External links 
https://web.archive.org/web/20091228173403/http://granjeras.canal13.cl/

Chilean reality television series
The Farm (franchise)
2005 Chilean television series debuts
2005 Chilean television series endings